Foy Gordon Chung (born 10 October 1975) is a Fijian former swimmer. He competed in four events at the 1992 Summer Olympics.

References

External links

1975 births
Living people
Fijian male swimmers
Olympic swimmers of Fiji
Swimmers at the 1992 Summer Olympics
Place of birth missing (living people)
20th-century Fijian people
21st-century Fijian people